The 1976 Kerry Senior Football Championship was the 76th staging of the Kerry Senior Football Championship since its establishment by the Kerry County Board in 1889. The championship ran from 27 June to 3 October 1976.

Austin Stacks entered the championship as the defending champions.

The final was played on 3 October 1976 at FitzGerald Stadium in Killarney, between Austin Stacks and Kenmare, in what was their first ever meeting in the final. Austin Stacks won the match by 1-14 to 0-07 to claim their eighth championship title overall and a second successive title.

Teams

17 teams participated in the championship. Austin Stacks, Feale Rangers, Shannon Rangers, Kenmare and Mid Kerry were seeded at received byes to the quarter-finals. The other 12 teams played off in the early rounds.

Results

Round 1

Round 2

Quarter-finals

Semi-finals

Final

Championship statistics

Miscellaneous

 The semi-final between Kenmare and Feale Rangers was abandoned by referee Buddy O'Grady, with nine minutes of actual playing time left. The decision was taken after a series of fracas between the players.

References

Kerry Senior Football Championship
1976 in Gaelic football